The Castelets is a  mountain summit located in the Alexandra River valley of Banff National Park, in the Canadian Rockies of Alberta, Canada. Its nearest higher peak is Terrace Mountain,  to the northwest. The Castelets can be seen from the Icefields Parkway with optimum photography conditions in morning light. 


History

The Castelets was so named in 1920 on account of its outline, said to be shaped like two castles. The mountain's name was made official in 1924 by the Geographical Names Board of Canada.

The first ascent of the mountain was made on July 9, 1923, by Conrad Kain and J. Thorington.

Geology

Like other mountains in Banff Park, The Castelets is composed of sedimentary rock laid down from the Precambrian to Jurassic periods. Formed in shallow seas, this sedimentary rock was pushed east and over the top of younger rock during the Laramide orogeny.

Climate

Based on the Köppen climate classification, The Castelets is located in a subarctic climate with cold, snowy winters, and mild summers. Precipitation runoff from The Castelets drains into the Alexandra River.

References

External links
 Parks Canada web site: Banff National Park

Two-thousanders of Alberta
Mountains of Banff National Park
Alberta's Rockies